Nigeria competed at the 2022 World Athletics Championships in Eugene, United States, from 15 to 24 July 2022. The Athletics Federation of Nigeria entered 24 athletes.

On 24 July 2022, Nigeria achieved its first world gold medal at the World Athletics Championships after Tobi Amusan won the women's 100 metres hurdles final. Amusan setted a new world record when she ran a 12.12 time in her semi-final heat before she bettered that in the final when she crossed the line in a time of 12.06, however, her time in the final was not considered as the new world record due to the wind reading (+2.5 MPS) was over the allowable.

With 1 gold and 1 silver medals, Nigeria ended 13rd in the medal table and ranked 20th in the overall placing table with a total of 23 points.

Medalists

Team
On 1 July 2022, the Athletics Federation of Nigeria (AFN) announced a 22-member team qualified for the World Athletics Championships, However, the final entry list published by World Athletics consigned 24 athletes for Nigeria, with Seye Ogunlewe (men's 4 × 100 metres relay) and Dotun Ogundeji (Shot put) being added to the Nigerian team.

Sprinters Usheoritse Itsekiri, Seye Ogunlewe and hurdler Tobi Amusan were included in the teams for the men and women's 4 × 100 metres relay respectively, but finally they had no participation. In the same way, Sikiru Adeyemi and Knowledge Omovoh were part of the mixed 4 × 400 metres relay team, but had no participation.

Results
Jamaica entered 24 athletes, but only 20 of them participated.

Men
Track events

Field events

Women
Track events

Field events

Mixed

References

External links
Oregon22｜WCH 22｜World Athletics

Nations at the 2022 World Athletics Championships
Nigeria at the World Championships in Athletics
2022 in Nigerian sport